Toth may refer to:

Tóth or Toth, a Hungarian and German surname
Lazlo Toth, a pen name of Don Novello used to write satirical letters
Toth alias Soky, a Hungarian noble family
Toth Brand Imaging, or Toth + Co, an advertising agency and design firm
Toth equation, related to the Langmuir adsorption model
Toth Nunataks, in Antarctica

See also

Thoth (disambiguation)
Tooth (disambiguation)
Na'Toth, a fictional character in Babylon 5

fr:Tóth